The 2017 Rally Australia (formally the 26. Kennards Hire Rally Australia 2017) was the 13th and final round of the 2017 World Rally Championship. The rally was held over three days between 17 November and 19 November 2017, and was based in Coffs Harbour, Australia. Thierry Neuville and Nicolas Gilsoul were the rally winners.

Entry list

Classification

Event standings

Special stages

Power Stage
The Power Stage was a  stage at the end of the rally.

Championship standings after the rally
Bold text indicates 2017 World Champions.

Drivers' Championship standings

Manufacturers' Championship standings

References

26. Kennards Hire Rally Australia 2017 ewrc-results.com

External links

 The official website of the World Rally Championship

2017 World Rally Championship season
2017
2017 in Australian motorsport
Rally Australia